Statistics of American Soccer League II in season 1954–55.

League standings

References
American Soccer League II (RSSSF)

American Soccer League (1933–1983) seasons
American Soccer League, 1954-55